John George (d.o.b./d.o.d unknown) was a Californian politician and the first African American elected to the Alameda County Board of Supervisors. George served as supervisor for the Alameda County's District 5 for over ten years from December 1976 to January 1989.

A psychiatric hospital administered by the Alameda County Medical Center, the John George Psychiatric Pavilion opened in 1992 and was named after George to honor his advocacy for the mentally ill. George had stated "My people [African Americans] were the first laboratory animals in America." In October 1989 a Democratic Party club was formed and also named after George, the John George Democratic Club  whose goals are "In his memory and in an effort to keep his voice and vision alive in the Democratic Party."

George is described as  the leading proponent of the health care, welfare, and workers' rights of all County citizens, an early activist in the struggle for civil rights and affirmative action and a long-time leader in the local Anti-Apartheid Movement.

References

Year of birth missing
Year of death missing
American civil rights activists
County supervisors in California
California Democrats
African-American people in California politics
Politicians from Oakland, California
Activists from California